Ixtacomitán is a town and one of the 119 Municipalities of Chiapas, in southern Mexico.

As of 2010, the municipality had a total population of 10,176, up from 9,143 as of 2005. It covers an area of 149 km².

As of 2010, the town of Ixtacomitán had a population of 4,835. Other than the town of Ixtacomitán, the municipality had 72 localities, none of which had a population over 1,000.

References

Municipalities of Chiapas